Baik Hyun-man (born January 27, 1964) is a former heavyweight amateur boxer from South Korea, who won the silver medal in his weight division at the 1988 Summer Olympics in Seoul, South Korea. In the final he was knocked out in the first round by Ray Mercer of the United States.

Results

References

External links
 databaseOlympics

1964 births
Living people
Heavyweight boxers
Boxers at the 1988 Summer Olympics
Olympic boxers of South Korea
Olympic silver medalists for South Korea
Olympic medalists in boxing
Asian Games medalists in boxing
Boxers at the 1986 Asian Games
Boxers at the 1990 Asian Games
South Korean male boxers
Medalists at the 1988 Summer Olympics
Asian Games gold medalists for South Korea

Medalists at the 1986 Asian Games
Medalists at the 1990 Asian Games